Elacatis is a genus of false tiger beetles in the family Salpingidae. There are about 13 described species in Elacatis.

Species
These 13 species belong to the genus Elacatis:

 Elacatis artichorax (Pic, 1875)
 Elacatis bakeri Chapin
 Elacatis californicus (Mannerheim, 1843)
 Elacatis delusa
 Elacatis fasciatus (Bland, 1864)
 Elacatis formosanus (Borchmann, 1916)
 Elacatis longicornis Horn, 1871
 Elacatis lugubris (Horn, 1868)
 Elacatis rugicollis (Borchmann, 1916)
 Elacatis senecionis (Champion, 1888)
 Elacatis similis (Borchmann, 1916)
 Elacatis umbrosus LeConte, 1861
 Elacatis undulata Chapin

References

Further reading

 

Salpingidae
Articles created by Qbugbot